Rowland Park is an unincorporated community in Cheltenham Township, Montgomery County, Pennsylvania, United States. The George K. Heller School, now the Cheltenham Center for the Arts, which is listed on the National Register of Historic Places, is located in Ashmead Village.

References

Unincorporated communities in Montgomery County, Pennsylvania
Unincorporated communities in Pennsylvania